Antibiotice Iași is a public pharmaceutical company which is one of the largest drug producing company in Romania. It is 53.02%-owned by the Romanian Ministry of Health. Its research center and production facilities are based in Valea Lupului, a commune near Iași.

Antibiotice produces 150 medicines for human use from 12 therapeutic areas, veterinary medicines, and active substances (Nystatin). Its products are exported to various countries, including the United Kingdom, United States, Hungary, Lithuania, Iraq, Yemen or Vietnam.

References

External links
 Official Site 
 Official Site 

Economy of Iași
Pharmaceutical companies of Romania
Romanian brands
Companies listed on the Bucharest Stock Exchange